Angela Ramello (8 January 1944 - 28 July 2004) was an Italian female middle-distance runner and cross-country runner who competed at individual senior level at the World Athletics Cross Country Championships (1975).

Biography
Ramello finished 7th at the 1971 European Athletics Indoor Championships – Women's 1500 metres.

Achievements

National titles
She won five national championships at individual senior level.
Italian Athletics Championships
800 m: 1971
1500 m: 1969
Italian Athletics Indoor Championships
800 m: 1970, 1975
Italian Cross Country Championships
Long race: 1972

References

External links
 

1944 births
2004 deaths
Italian female middle-distance runners
Italian female cross country runners
20th-century Italian women
21st-century Italian women